Zenon Waraszkiewicz (1909–1946) was a Polish mathematician who introduced Waraszkiewicz spirals.

References

1909 births
1946 deaths
20th-century Polish mathematicians